Greg M. Kirk (September 24, 1963 – December 22, 2019) was an American politician from Americus, Georgia. He was a member of the Georgia State Senate from the 13th District, representing the Georgian counties of Crisp, Dodge, Dooly, Lee, Tift, Turner, Worth and parts of Sumter and Wilcox from 2014 until his death in 2019. He was a member of the Republican Party.

Personal life
Kirk graduated with a master's degree in Psychology from Troy State University. He and his wife, Rosalyn, had seven children and five grandchildren. They lived in Americus, Georgia.

Georgia State Senate committee memberships
As of the 2017 Georgia Legislative Session, Sen. Kirk served on the following committees:
Agriculture and Consumer Affairs
Health and Human Services
Insurance and Labor and
Judiciary

Election history

2014 Republican Primary Election

Kirk did not face opposition in the 2014 General Election.

2016 General Election

2018 
Kirk ran unopposed in both the primary and general elections in 2018.

Health and death
Kirk announced in June 2019 that he had been diagnosed with bile duct cancer earlier that year, but said in an update in November that many of his tumors were "gone or shrunk". He entered outpatient hospice care for pain management the next month and said in a statement on December 18 that he planned to run for re-election in 2020. Four days later, on December 22, Kirk died at the age of 56.

References

External links
 

1963 births
2019 deaths
21st-century American politicians
Deaths from cancer in Georgia (U.S. state)
Deaths from cholangiocarcinoma
Georgia (U.S. state) Republicans
People from Americus, Georgia
Troy University alumni